This article shows the qualification phase for the 2022–23 CEV Champions League. 11 teams play in the qualification round. The two remaining teams will join the other 18 teams automatically qualified for the League round. All 9 eliminated teams will compete in the 2022–23 CEV Cup.

Participating teams
The Drawing of Lots took place on 28 June 2022 in Luxembourg City.

First round
All times are local.

|}

First leg
|}

Second leg
|}

Second round
All times are local.

|}

First leg
|}

Second leg
|}

Third round
All times are local.

|}

First leg
|}

Second leg
|}

References

External links
 Official website

Qualification
CEV Champions League qualification